Mortara is an Italian surname. Notable people with the surname include:

 Edgardo Mortara (1851–1940),  Italian priest, and central figure in the Mortara case in which papal authorities seized him from his Jewish family when he was six years old
 Edoardo Mortara (born 1987), professional Italian racecar driver
 Giorgio Mortara (1885–1967), Italian economist
 Marco Mortara (1815–1894), Italian rabbi

Italian-language surnames
Jewish surnames
Sephardic surnames